Spectrochemistry is the application of spectroscopy in several fields of chemistry. It includes analysis of spectra in chemical terms, and use of spectra to derive the structure of chemical compounds, and also to qualitatively and quantitively analyze their presence in the sample. It is a method of chemical analysis that relies on the measurement of wavelengths and intensity of electromagnetic radiation.

History 

It was not until 1666 that Isaac Newton showed that white lights from the sun could be dissipated into a continuous series of colors. So Newton introduced the concept which he called spectrum to describe this phenomenon. He used a small aperture to define the beam of light, a lens to collimate it, a glass prism to disperse it, and a screen to display the resulting spectrum. Newton's analysis of light was the beginning of the science of spectroscopy. Later, It became clear that the Sun's radiation might have components outside the visible portion of the spectrum. In 1800 William Hershel showed that the sun's radiation extended into infrared, and in 1801 John Wilhelm Ritter also made a similar observation in the ultraviolet. Joseph Von Fraunhofer extended Newton's discovery by observing the sun's spectrum when sufficiently dispersed was blocked by a fine dark lines now known as Fraunhofer lines.  Fraunhofer also developed diffracting grating, which disperses the lights in much the same way as does a glass prism but with some advantages. the grating applied interference of lights to produce diffraction provides a direct measuring of wavelengths of diffracted beams. So by extending Thomas Young's study which demonstrated that a light beam passes slit emerges in patterns of light and dark edges Fraunhofer was able to directly measure the wavelengths of spectral lines. However, despite his enormous achievements, Fraunhofer was unable to understand the origins of the special line in which he observed. It was not until 33 years after his passing that Gustav Kirchhoff established that each element and compound has its unique spectrum and that by studying the spectrum of an unknown source, one could determine its chemical compositions, and with these advancements, spectroscopy became a truly scientific method of analyzing the structures of chemical compounds. Therefore, by recognizing that each atom and molecule has its spectrum Kirchhoff and Robert Bunsen established spectroscopy as a scientific tool for probing atomic and molecular structures and founded the field of spectrochemical analysis for analyzing the composition of materials.

IR Spectra Tables & Charts 
IR Spectrum Table by Frequency

IR Spectra Table by Compound Class

To use an IR spectrum table, first need to find the frequency or compound in the first column, depending on which type of chart that is being used. Then find the corresponding values for absorption, appearance and other attributes. The value for absorption is usually in cm−1.

NOTE: NOT ALL FREQUENCIES HAVE A RELATED COMPOUND.

Applications

Evaluation of Dual - Spectrum IR Spectrogram System on Invasive Ductal Carcinoma (IDC) Breast cancer

Invasive Ductal Carcinoma (IDC) is one of the common types of breast cancer which accounts for 8 out of 10 of all invasive breast cancers. According to the American Cancer Society, more than 180,000 women in the United States find out that they have breast cancers each year, and most are diagnosed with this specific type of cancer. While it is essential to detect breast cancer early to reduce the death rate there may be already more than 10,000,000 cells in breast cancer when it can be observed by x-ray mammograms. however, the IR Spectrum proposed by Szu et al seems to be more promising in detecting breast cancer cells several months ahead of a mammogram. Clinical tests have been carried out with approval of Institutional Review Board of National Taiwan University Hospital. So from August 2007 to June 2008 35 patients aged between (30-66) with an average age of 49 were enlisted in this project. the results established that about 63% of the success rate could be achieved with the cross-sectional data. Therefore the results concluded that breast cancers may be detected more accurately by cross-referencing S1 maps of multiple three-points.

Molecular spectroscopic Methods to Elucidation of Lignin Structure

A Ligninin plant cell is a complex amorphous polymer and it is biosynthesized  from three aromatic alcohols, namely P-Coumaryl, Coniferyl, and Sinapyl alcohols. Lignin is a highly branched polymer and accounts for 15-30% by weight of lignocellulosic biomass (LCBM), so the structure of lignin will vary significantly according to the type of LCBM and the composition will depend on the degradation process. This biosynthesis process is mainly consists of radical coupling reactions and it generates a particular lignin polymer in each plant species. So due to having a complex structure, various molecular spectroscopic methods have been applied to resolve the aromatic units and different interunit linkages in lignin from distinct plant species.

References 

Spectroscopy